The Beetle and Wedge Boathouse is a restaurant set on the site of the Moulsford ferry service, on a bank of the River Thames on Ferry Lane in Moulsford, Oxfordshire, England.  The restaurant has a riverside setting on the stretch of river immortalised in The Wind in the Willows, and also Jerome K Jerome's chronicles of the escapades of his friends in Three Men in a Boat. The unusual name refers to a beetle, a term for a maul (or hammer) used with a wedge to split wood.

In 2005 the restaurant played host to Griff Rhys Jones, Dara Ó Briain and Rory McGrath, and a dog called Loli, during the filming of Three Men in a Boat – a film broadcast and commissioned by the BBC as a modern-day reinterpretation of the travelogue by Jerome K Jerome.

The restaurant was listed amongst Britain's 250 Best Restaurants in the Harper's Bazaar 2009 Going Out Guide.

The building that houses the restaurant was once a working boathouse and was last used for the ferry in 1967, when the last ferrywoman retired and the service was discontinued. The boathouse retains much of its original fittings and sits on the water's edge with the original slipway still in place. The building dates back to before 1860 when it was a trading inn.

External links
Official website
Oxford Restaurant Guide information

Restaurants in Oxfordshire
Pubs in Oxfordshire
Buildings and structures on the River Thames
Restaurants established in 1967
1967 establishments in England